The Alberta Teachers House is a historic house in Alberta, Minnesota, United States.  It was built in 1917 to provide urbane, apartment-like housing for faculty of the adjacent school as part of the era's efforts to modernize rural education.  The house was listed on the National Register of Historic Places in 1983 for having local significance in the themes of education and social history.  It was nominated for its associations with a key period in the development of Minnesota's rural education system.  At the time the state's numerous one-room schoolhouses were being consolidated into fewer, larger facilities centered in towns and cities.  The Alberta Teachers House was an experiment by the General Education Board, a national philanthropic foundation, intended to engender community building and make rural teaching posts more appealing.

See also
 National Register of Historic Places listings in Stevens County, Minnesota

References

1917 establishments in Minnesota
American Craftsman architecture in Minnesota
Buildings and structures in Stevens County, Minnesota
Education in Stevens County, Minnesota
Houses completed in 1917
National Register of Historic Places in Stevens County, Minnesota
Residential buildings on the National Register of Historic Places in Minnesota